On 19 February 2017, at least 39 people were killed after a car bomb exploded near Wadajir market in Madina district, Mogadishu, Somalia. More than 50 others were wounded. No group claimed responsibility; Somali President Mohamed Abdullahi Mohamed offered a $100,000 reward for information leading to the arrest of those who planned the blast.

Reactions 
 - Members of the UN Security Council expressed their deep sympathy and condolences to the families of the victims, as well as to the Somali people and government. The council also wished a speedy recovery to those injured.

References

2010s in Mogadishu
2017 in Somalia
2017 murders in Somalia
February 2017 bombing
21st-century mass murder in Somalia
Car and truck bombings in Somalia
February 2017 crimes in Africa
February 2017 events in Africa
February 2017
Marketplace attacks
Mass murder in 2017
February 2017 bombing
Terrorist incidents in Somalia in 2017
Somali Civil War (2009–present)